Ferenc Weisz (23 February 1885 – 8 July 1944) was a Hungarian football player and manager. Weisz, who was Jewish, played club football as a striker for Ferencváros and MTK, winning the Hungarian league nine times. He also represented his country at international level, earning 17 caps between 1903 and 1917. After retiring as a player in 1920, Weisz became manager of Újpest between 1920 and 1922. 

Weisz was deported with his wife from the Budapest outskirts to Auschwitz concentration camp in 1944, where he was murdered.

References

External links
Jews In Sports

1885 births
1944 deaths
Hungarian Jews
Hungarian footballers
Hungarian football managers
Hungary international footballers
Újpest FC managers
Jewish footballers
Hungarian Jews who died in the Holocaust
Hungarian people who died in Auschwitz concentration camp
Jewish Hungarian sportspeople
Association football forwards